The Illinois River is a tributary, about  long, of the Rogue River in the U.S. state of Oregon. It drains part of the Klamath Mountains in northern California and southwestern Oregon. The river's main stem begins at the confluence of its east and west forks near Cave Junction in southern Josephine County. Its drainage basin includes Sucker Creek, which rises in the Red Buttes Wilderness, near Whiskey Peak on the California state line. The main stem flows generally northwest in a winding course past Kerby and through the Siskiyou National Forest and Kalmiopsis Wilderness. It joins the Rogue River from the south at Agness on the Curry–Josephine county line,  from the Pacific Ocean.

The river's lower , from where it enters the Rogue River–Siskiyou National Forest downstream from Kerby to its confluence with the Rogue River, were designated Wild and Scenic in 1984.

Tributaries
Sucker Creek is named after the state of Illinois, one of whose nicknames is the Sucker State.  Miners from Illinois named the creek.  In 2011, the United States Forest Service worked on a project to improve the creek. The project is a fishery rehabilitation project.

Rafting and kayaking

The Illinois River is "a wilderness river that tests both the skill and strength of boaters". For the  run along the Wild and Scenic part of the river between upper Oak Flat near Kerby and lower Oak Flat, boaters are far from trails and roads. In fact, it is "the most inaccessible river canyon in the lower 48 states..." with sections that are inaccessible, even by trail. Depending on the water flow, this stretch of the river has eight class IV to IV+ rapids. Green Wall, a class V, "is considerably more difficult and longer than the others" and below it lie  of difficult rapids. The river is generally run by raft or kayak during the rainy season, October through April. At flows below , boating is difficult because of exposed rocks, and flows above  "turn the river into boiling holes and rapids." A heavy rain can turn an ordinary trip into a high-water nightmare.

Permits from the U.S. Forest Service are required (year round) for river trips on the Wild Section of the river (between Briggs Creek and Nancy Creek) and groups are limited to no more than twelve.  However, the permits for non-commercial groups are free and are self issued 24/7, but the permit must also be deposited at Oak Flat to verify the safe completion of the trip. Since there is no dam on the Illinois River, river flows are highly dependent upon weather conditions. Changing weather can often result in water levels being too high or too low for safe and successful navigation. Furthermore, since water levels can rise rapidly, potential bad weather can also be the cause for cancelled or postponed trips. Nevertheless, even under acceptable conditions, the Illinois River can still cause casualties.

See also
 List of longest streams of Oregon
 List of rivers of Oregon

Notes

References

External links

 

Rivers of Oregon
Rogue River (Oregon)
Wild and Scenic Rivers of the United States
Rivers of Curry County, Oregon
Rivers of Josephine County, Oregon